Malcolm X Day is an American holiday in honor of Malcolm X that is celebrated on either May 19 (his birthday) or the third Friday of May. The commemoration of the civil rights leader has been proposed as an official state holiday in the U.S. state of Illinois in 2015 and Missouri as recent as 2019.  As of present, only the cities of Berkeley and Oakland in California, observe the holiday with city offices and schools closed.  After Juneteenth became a federal holiday, there are growing calls for Malcolm X Day to also be observed as a federal holiday.

History
The Malcolm X Day holiday has been an official holiday in the municipality of Berkeley, California since 1979. Since then, there have been multiple proposals for the holiday to be official elsewhere. Most recently in 2014, a proposal put forth by the Council of Islamic Organizations of Chicago to make the holiday in the U.S. state of Illinois. The Illinois proposal differs from the Berkeley, California resolution in that the holiday would be observed May 19 instead of the third Friday in May. Before that, unsuccessful attempts were made in Atlanta, Georgia, and Washington, D.C., with numerous calls for it to be celebrated alongside Martin Luther King Jr. Day as a federal holiday. In 1993, this holiday was proposed at the federal level to Congress as H.J.R. #323 by Congressman Charles Rangel. In 2015, the Illinois Senate unanimously passed the resolution for the official holiday designation where the law "... officially designated 'May 19, 2015, and every May 19 thereafter' as Malcolm X Day. Though the resolution passed making the holiday official, the Illinois official list of holidays still has yet to reflect the holiday.

Observances by state

See also
 Public holidays in the United States

Notes

References

External links
 Malcolm X Day, Washington, D.C.
 Malcolm X Day, The University of Kansas Medical Center Diversity Calendar
 May 19 is now Malcolm X Day in Illinois, The Council of Islamic Organizations of Greater Chicago
 

Public holidays in the United States
Memorials to Malcolm X
May observances
Culture of Berkeley, California
Government of Berkeley, California
State holidays in the United States
Birthdays